Snuella sedimenti is a Gram-negative, aerobic, rod-shaped and motile bacterium from the genus of Snuella which has been isolated from marine sediments from the Shodo Island.

References

Flavobacteria
Bacteria described in 2021